Lorong Chuan MRT station is an underground Mass Rapid Transit (MRT) station on the Circle line in Serangoon, Singapore. It is located underneath Serangoon Avenue 3 near the junction of Lorong Chuan, which the station is named after. The station is in close proximity to schools such as the Nanyang Junior College, Zhonghua Secondary School, Yangzheng Primary School and the Australian International School Singapore, and also near to other condominiums such as The Scala, Goldenhill Park, Chuan Park, Chiltern Park and The Springbloom.

History

In June 2003, the Singapore Land Authority (SLA) offered Chuan Park (a 99-year leasehold condo near the site of the station) residents S$1 for 220 sq m of land, which comprised mainly car park lots, as the land was necessary to build the Circle line. Nominal compensation was paid as it takes into account the increase in the market value of the condominium when the MRT station is built on the acquired land.

Contract C825A for the construction and completion of Lorong Chuan station was awarded to Sato Kogyo (S) Pte Ltd at a sum of S$65 million in June 2003.

The station was opened on 28 May 2009 along with the rest of Stage 3 of the Circle line, delayed due to the Nicoll Highway collapse on 20 April 2004. Before the station opened, Singapore Civil Defence Force conducted the third Shelter Open House at this station on 4 April that year, together with Bartley and Bishan stations. The Land Transport Authority also organised a Circle line Discovery open house on 23 May that year on all stations of the Stage 3 of the Circle line.

Station Art 
As part of the Art-in-Transit, Yoma and A Dose of Light designed a hand-drawn artwork, Through the Looking Glass, depicting the entire island of Singapore as well as the seafaring activities.

References

External links
 

Railway stations in Singapore opened in 2009
Railway stations in Serangoon
Mass Rapid Transit (Singapore) stations